Robert Chadwick Berry (born March 10, 1942) is an American former professional football player who was a quarterback in the National Football League (NFL) for twelve seasons. He was selected to one Pro Bowl in 1969 as a member of the Atlanta Falcons. Berry was a member of three Super Bowl teams with the Minnesota Vikings  in the mid-1970s.

College career
Born and raised in San Jose, California, Berry played football at Willow Glen High School, where his father was a longtime head coach. He graduated in 1960 and played college football at Oregon, where he was a three-year letter winner under head coach Len Casanova. At Oregon, Berry teamed with future Pro Football Hall of Famers Mel Renfro and Dave Wilcox and led the Ducks to three consecutive winning seasons. In his junior year in 1963, Oregon's last as an independent, the Ducks beat SMU 21–14 in the Sun Bowl on New Year's Eve. (The Pacific-8 conference did not allow a second bowl team until 1975).

He was named a first-team All-American after his senior season, despite being edged out as All-Pacific-8 quarterback by Craig Morton of California. In the balloting for the Heisman Trophy won by John Huarte of Notre Dame, Berry was thirteenth, just behind Joe Namath (Alabama) and Gale Sayers (Kansas). His teammates named him the outstanding player and he played in the East-West Shrine Game and the Hula Bowl.

In 1985, Berry received the university's distinguished alumnus award. Berry was inducted to the Oregon Sports Hall of Fame in 1987 and the University of Oregon Sports Hall of Fame in 1992.

Professional career

Minnesota Vikings
Selected by the Philadelphia Eagles in the eleventh round of the 1964 NFL Draft and by the Denver Broncos in the twenty-sixth round of the 1964 AFL Draft, Berry played his senior season at Oregon in 1964 and signed with the Minnesota Vikings in late November. Minnesota had acquired his draft rights in an off-season trade with the Eagles. Berry was out of college during the 1961 season, a de facto redshirt year.

Berry played three seasons with the Vikings, the first two under head coach Norm Van Brocklin, a former Oregon quarterback, and was primarily a reserve behind Fran Tarkenton. He made his first start in 1966, a loss in the snow at home to the expansion Atlanta Falcons on December 4. Following the 1966 season, Tarkenton demanded to be traded and was sent to the New York Giants for multiple draft picks and Van Brocklin stepped down as head coach. Joe Kapp was the starting quarterback under new head coach Bud Grant in 1967 and Berry saw very limited action. In training camp in 1968, Berry was behind Kapp and Gary Cuozzo and missed the final cut in early September.

Atlanta Falcons
Berry was quickly picked up by the Atlanta Falcons in 1968, and Van Brocklin became the head coach after the third game of the season. Berry started 51 games for the Falcons in five seasons, through 1972, throwing for 8,489 yards and 57 touchdowns, with a passer rating of 79.2. He was selected to the Pro Bowl in 1969, and was traded back to the Vikings in May 1973.

Second stint with Vikings
Berry played for the Minnesota Vikings again for four seasons, starting in  1973. He was again the backup to Tarkenton, and Minnesota played in three Super Bowls (VIII, IX, and XI) during this second stint, all losses. Berry retired from football on the first day of 1977 training camp, July 28.

Personal
Berry has a daughter, Jennifer (born 1972) and a son, Michael (born 1993) and two grandchildren. Berry resides in Corralitos, California.

Berry's younger brother Ken was the starting quarterback at San Jose State and the two teams met in 1963.

See also
 List of NCAA major college football yearly passing leaders

References

External links

1942 births
Living people
Players of American football from San Jose, California
American football quarterbacks
Oregon Ducks football players
Atlanta Falcons players
Minnesota Vikings players
Western Conference Pro Bowl players
People from Gardnerville, Nevada